Terrence Caroo (born 30 August 1964) is a Saint Lucian professional football manager.

Career
Since January 2006 until June 2010 he coached the Saint Lucia national football team.

References

External links
Profile at Soccerway.com
Profile at Soccerpunter.com

1964 births
Living people
Saint Lucian football managers
Saint Lucia national football team managers
Place of birth missing (living people)